Frangos or Fragkos is a Greek surname. It means "Frank", referring to a Western European or a Roman Catholic person.

 Andreas Frangos (born 1997), Cypriot football player
 Andreas-Dimitrios Frangos (born 1989), Greek volleyball player
 Antonis Frangos (born 1979), Cypriot/Living in Greece, Entrepreneur (Gold Award as the youngest Greek entrepreneur. He run Multiple IT businesses. Due to his extreme lifestyle he went bankrupt on 2005. 
 Athanasios Frangos (1864-1923), Greek general
 Frangoulis Frangos (born 1951), Greek general
 Nick Frangos, Greek-American poker player
Steve Frangos, Greek-american writer for the National HeralHerald

See also 

 Frango

Greek-language surnames
Surnames